We Hold the Line (original title: Die Unbeugsamen: Gefährdete Pressefreiheit auf den Philippinen) is a 2020 documentary film about the Philippine drug war and political corruption and violence under Philippine President Rodrigo Duterte.

Synopsis
We Hold the Line documents the Philippine drug war and political corruption by the regime and entourage of Philippine President Rodrigo Duterte, told through politicians, members of the death squads, those who have escaped the killing, and through independent Philippine media.

It particularly features the Philippine investigative media group Rappler, and its star crusading Philippine journalist, 2021 Nobel Peace Prize laureate Maria Ressa, who is harassed and arrested for her efforts.

Production
The 92-minute German film (in English with some Tagalog), was directed by Marc Wiese, and produced by Oliver Stoltz for Dreamer Joint Venture Filmproduktion, GmbH. Germany-based Magnetfilm holds the international rights.

Recognition

Film festivals
The film's Dutch premiere was at the International Documentary Film Festival Amsterdam

The film was screened online on the closing day of the 13th annual This Human World – International Human Rights Film Festival, of the International Press Institute, and in its first online edition. (Ressa was a member of the IPI board).

It was also featured at the 2020 CPH:DOX (Copenhagen International Documentary Film Festival), 2020 Dokufest International Documentary and Short Film Festival, and the 2020 Moscow International Film Festival

It was also featured at the 17th VERZIÓ Human Rights Documentary Film Festival / 2020 VERZIÓ Film Festival. and the 2021 ReFrame Film Festival.

Awards & nominations
 Winner, 2020 F:ACT Award, CPH:DOX (Copenhagen International Documentary Film Festival)
 Nominee, 2020 Truth Award, Dokufest International Documentary and Short Film Festival
 Winner, 2020 Award for Artistic Excellence,  Moscow International Film Festival
 Nominee, 2020  Silver St. George,  Moscow International Film Festival

References

External links
 We Hold the Line, official trailer on Vimeo.com
 We Hold the Line, trailer on Cineuropa
 We Hold the Line, at International Documentary Film Festival Amsterdam

2020 documentary films
Films shot in the Philippines
2020 films
German documentary films